A penumbral lunar eclipse took place on Tuesday, April 14, 1987, the first of two lunar eclipses in 1987, the second being on October 7, 1987. This subtle penumbral eclipse may have been visible to a skilled observer at maximum eclipse. 77.703% of the Moon's disc was partially shaded by the Earth (none of it was in total shadow), which caused a gentle shadow gradient across its disc at maximum; the eclipse as a whole lasted 3 hours, 54 minutes and 12.8 seconds. The Moon was just 4.6 days before perigee (Perigee on Saturday, April 18, 1987), making it 0.5% larger than average.

Visibility 
It was completely visible over North America, South America, the Atlantic Ocean, Europe, Africa and west in Asia, seen rising over the Pacific Ocean and North America and setting over South Asia and the Indian Ocean.

Member 
This is the 22nd member of Lunar Saros 141. The previous event was the April 1969 lunar eclipse. The next event is the April 2005 lunar eclipse.

Related lunar eclipses

Eclipses of 1987 
 A hybrid solar eclipse on March 29.
 A penumbral lunar eclipse on April 14.
 An annular solar eclipse on September 23.
 A penumbral lunar eclipse on October 7.

Lunar year series

Saros series 

Lunar Saros 141, repeating every 18 years and 11 days, has a total of 72 lunar eclipse events including 26 total lunar eclipses.

First Penumbral Lunar Eclipse: 1608 Aug 25

First Partial Lunar Eclipse: 2041 May 16

First Total Lunar Eclipse: 2167 Aug 01

First Central Lunar Eclipse: 2221 Sep 02

Greatest Eclipse of the Lunar Saros 141: 2293 Oct 16

Last Central Lunar Eclipse: 2546 Mar 18

Last Total Lunar Eclipse: 2618 May 01

Last Partial Lunar Eclipse: 2744 Jul 16

Last Penumbral Lunar Eclipse: 2888 Oct 11

1901-2100

March 1915 lunar eclipse

March 1933 lunar eclipse

March 1951 lunar eclipse

April 1969 lunar eclipse

April 1987 lunar eclipse

April 2005 lunar eclipse

May 2023 lunar eclipse

May 2041 lunar eclipse

May 2059 lunar eclipse

June 2077 lunar eclipse

June 2095 lunar eclipse

Half-Saros cycle
A lunar eclipse will be preceded and followed by solar eclipses by 9 years and 5.5 days (a half saros). This lunar eclipse is related to two partial solar eclipses of Solar Saros 148.

See also 
List of lunar eclipses
List of 20th-century lunar eclipses

Notes

External links 
 

1987-04
1987 in science
April 1987 events